Castle Ravenloft Board Game is a board game published in 2010 by Wizards of the Coast. It was the first game released in the Dungeons & Dragons Adventure System board game series.

Overview
In Castle Ravenloft Board Game, the players control Heroes who have come to Barovia to discover the secrets of Castle Ravenloft, and must work as a team to succeed in the adventures within the castle. It features multiple scenarios and quests.

Gameplay
Castle Ravenloft Board Game is a co-operative game for 1-5 players.  Each player selects a Hero, and can choose from the Dragonborn Fighter, Human Rogue, Dwarf Cleric, Eladrin Wizard, and Human Ranger.

Contents
Castle Ravenloft Board Game includes 40 plastic heroes and monsters, 13 sheets of interlocking cardstock dungeon tiles, 200 encounter and treasure cards, a rulebook, a scenario book, and a 20-sided die.

Reception
David M. Ewalt of Forbes comments: "Count Strahd von Zarovich and Castle Ravenloft — stars of a beloved Dungeons & Dragons setting — make their board game debut. It's like playing fourth edition D&D, but without a dungeon master or most of the rules. Anyone can play, even if they don't know D&D. It's cooperative, challenging and fun."

Scott Taylor of Black Gate comments: "I have to give the designs props for creating a fresh version of an old concept and if you’re looking to have a few hours of fun on a weekend night".

Castle Ravenloft won the Origins Award for Best Board Game of 2010.

Castle Ravenloft Boardgame received the gold ENnie Award for Best RPG Related Product.

References

Board games introduced in 2010
Dungeons & Dragons board games
ENnies winners
Origins Award winners